Onychagrotis was a genus of moths of the family Noctuidae, it is now considered a synonym of Agrotis.

Former species
 Onychagrotis rileyana (Morrison, 1875)

References
Natural History Museum Lepidoptera genus database
Onychagrotis at funet

Noctuinae